B744 may refer to:

 The Boeing 747-400 airliner
 The B744 road in Ayrshire, Scotland